Italian Platinum is the eighth full-length album released by indie rock band Silkworm. It is the band's third album released on Touch and Go Records. Like their previous album Lifestyle, Steve Albini and his girlfriend Heather Whinna recorded and produced the album respectively. Matt Kadane from Bedhead and The New Year played keyboards on this album.

Track listing
"(I Hope U) Don't Survive" – (3:25)
"The Third" – (2:09)
"The Old You" – (3:22)
"Is She a Sign" – (2:28)
"The Brain" – (2:59)
"Bourbon Beard" – (3:13)
"LR72" – (4:12)
"White Lightning" – (3:20)
"Dirty Air" – (2:41)
"Young" – (3:27)
"Moving" – (2:52)
"The Ram" – (2:43)
"A Cockfight of Feelings" – (3:37)

Personnel
Andy Cohen—Guitar, Vocals
Michael Dahlquist—Drums, Vocals
Tim Midyett—Bass, Baritone Guitar, Vocals
Matt Kadane—Keyboards
Steve Albini—Engineer
Heather Whinna—Producer
Kelly Hogan—Backing Vocals, Lead vocals on "Young"
Nick Webb—Mastering

References

2002 albums
Silkworm (band) albums
Touch and Go Records albums
Albums produced by Steve Albini